The Governor of Portsmouth was the Constable of Portchester Castle from the 13th Century to the reign of Henry VIII. Since then Portsmouth had its own military Captain or Governor, who was based in the Square Tower built in Old Portsmouth in 1494 as part of the fortifications to protect the rapidly expanding naval port. The Coats of Arms of former Governors of Portsmouth are displayed on the walls of the Square Tower's Lower Hall. In 1540, the Hospital of St. Nicholas, suitably converted and modernised, became the military centre of the town. Its Domus Dei, now the roofless Royal Garrison Church, became the residence of the Captain or Governor. The Governorship was abolished in 1834.

The Lieutenant Governorship was vested in the General Officer Commanding South-West District from 1793 to 1865, in the General Officer Commanding Southern District from 1865 to 1903 and in the Officer Commanding Portsmouth Defences / Portsmouth Garrison from 1903 until that post was abolished in 1968.

Constables of the King's Castle at Portchester and Town of Portsmouth
 1289–1290: Henry Hussey	
 1316:	Eustace de Haeche	 
 1327:	John de Basing	
 1335-1337: Richard FitzAlan, 10th Earl of Arundel
 1338:	John Hacket	
 1339-1342: Richard FitzAlan, 11th Earl of Arundel
 1347:	Eustace de Hocke	 
 1361-1367: John de Edyndon	 
 1369-1376: Richard FitzAlan, 11th Earl of Arundel
 1376–1381: Sir Robert Ashton
 1441:	Sir John Cherowin	 
 1451–1453: John Talbot, 1st Earl of Shrewsbury
 1454: Richard Neville, 5th Earl of Salisbury
 1461:	John Tiptoft, 1st Earl of Worcester	
 1468: William Fiennes de Saye	 
 1473:	Anthony Widvile	 
 1483:	Sir William Uvedale	 
 1483–1484: William Mirfield
 1509: William Cope
 1511: Stephen Cope
 1513: Thomas FitzAlan, 12th Earl of Arundel

Governors of Portsmouth
1544–1545: Sir Anthony Knyset
1545: John Chadderton (Captain of Portsmouth)
1545: William Paulet, 1st Marquess of Winchester
1551/2–1554: Richard Wingfield
1554–1559: Lord Chidiock Paulet (Captain)
1559–1571: Sir Adrian Poynings
1571–1593: Henry Radclyffe, 4th Earl of Sussex (Warden and Captain)
1593/4–1606: Charles Blount, 8th Baron Mountjoy 
1606–1609: Sir Francis Vere
1609–1630: William Herbert, 3rd Earl of Pembroke
1630–1638: Edward Cecil, 1st Viscount Wimbledon
1638/9–1642: George Goring, 1st Baron Goring
1642–1643: Sir William Lewis, 1st Baronet (Parliamentary)
1644: William Jephson
1645: Richard Norton
1648: Robert Legg
1648: George Goring, 1st Baron Goring
1649: John Feilder
1649: John Desborough
1649–1659: Nathaniel Whetham
1660–1661: Richard Norton
1661–1673: Prince James, Duke of York
1673-1682: George Legge, 1st Baron Dartmouth
1682-1687: Edward Noel, 1st Earl of Gainsborough
1687-1689: James FitzJames, 1st Duke of Berwick
1690-1694: Thomas Tollemache
1694-1712: Thomas Erle
1712-1714: William North, 6th Baron North and Grey
1714-1718: Thomas Erle
1718-1719: Charles Wills
1719-1730: George MacCartney
1730-1737: John Campbell, 2nd Duke of Argyll
1737-1740: Richard Boyle, 2nd Viscount Shannon
1740-1752: Philip Honywood
1752-1759: Henry Hawley
1759-1773: James O'Hara, 2nd Baron Tyrawley
1773-1778: Edward Harvey
1778-1782: Robert Monckton
1782-1794: Henry Herbert, 10th Earl of Pembroke
1794-1810: Sir William Pitt
1810-1811: Hon. Henry Fox
1811-1826: William Harcourt, 3rd Earl Harcourt
1826-1827: Sir William Keppel
3 November 1827 – 1834: Prince William Frederick, Duke of Gloucester and Edinburgh

Lieutenant-Governors of Portsmouth
1514: Sir Thomas Wyndham
1558–1559?: Edward Turnour	 	 
1593/4?–1605: Sir Benjamin Berry
1615: Sir John Burlace
1620–1624: Sir John Oglander	 
1624: Sir Richard Morrison	 
1630?: Sir Thomas Brett
1640-1: Robert Willis
1647-?: Colonel Thomas Betsworth (or Bettesworth or Bettisworth)
1656: Major Peter Murford
1662: Sir William Berkeley
1665: Sir Phillip Honywood	 
1672: George Legge	 
1673: Henry Slingsby
1689: Colonel Rearsby
1689: Colonel Sir John Gibson
1697: Hon. Robert Fregue
1701: Colonel Sir John Gibson
1717: Hon. Colonel Peter Hawker
1731: General Hon. Peter Campbell
1751: John Leighton
15 February 1752: Captain John Murray
27 March 1775: Colonel Robert Watson
18 September 1790: Colonel Thomas Trigge
16 January 1796: Lieutenant-General Cornelius Cuyler
21 February 1799: Major-General Thomas Murray
25 June 1799: Major-General John Whitelocke
10 November 1804: Colonel Hildebrand Oakes
22 June 1805: Major-General Hon. John Hope
24 December 1805: Major-General Sir George Prevost	 
26 January 1808: Major-General Arthur Whetham
20 May 1813: Lieutenant-General Hon. Thomas Maitland
27 January 1814: Major-General William Houston	 
25 September 1814: Major-General Kenneth Alexander Howard
21 August 1819: Major-General Sir James Kempt GCB
20 October 1819: Major-General Sir George Cooke KCB	 
23 July 1821: Major-General Sir James Lyon KCB
20 March 1828: Major-General Sir Colin Campbell KCB
1834: Major-General Sir Thomas McMahon KCB
1839: Lieutenant-General Sir Hercules Pakenham
1846: Lieutenant-General Lord Frederick FitzClarence
1851: Major-General Sir George D'Aguilar
1852: Major-General Sir James Simpson
1855: Major-General Henry William Breton
1857: Lieutenant-General the Hon. Sir James Scarlett
1860: Major-General Lord William Paulet
1865: Lieutenant-General Sir George Buller
1870: General Viscount Templetown
1874: General Sir Charles Hastings Doyle
1877: General Sir John Garvock
1878: General Prince Edward of Saxe-Weimar-Eisenach
1884: General Sir George Willis
1889: General the Hon. Sir Leicester Smyth
1890: Lieutenant-General the Duke of Connaught and Strathearn
1893: Major General Sir John Davis
1898: Lieutenant General Sir Baker Creed Russell

Town Majors of Portsmouth
16 October 1753: Patrick Douglas
1781: Thomas Smelt
to 1806: Grant
18 October 1806: Nathan Ashurst
12 January 1821: Robert Simpson
2 October 1823: Henry White
in 1849, 1854: Frederick Thomas Maitland

Sources

 Robert Walcott, English Politics in the Early Eighteenth Century (Oxford: Oxford University Press, 1956)

Governors of Portsmouth
Portsmouth
Portsmouth